Lee Ho-sung (born September 12, 1974) is a football player from South Korea.

He was a member of the South Korea U-20 team and South Korea U-23 team in early 1990s and went on to play as a professional in the K-League before moving to Singapore, to the S. League, where he played for Balestier Khalsa FC.

Club career 
1997–2001 Daejeon Citizen
2002–2003 Goyang Kookmin Bank
2004 Balestier Khalsa

External links
 
 N-League Player Record - 이호성 
 

1974 births
Living people
Association football forwards
South Korean footballers
South Korean expatriate footballers
Daejeon Hana Citizen FC players
Balestier Khalsa FC players
K League 1 players
Korea National League players
Singapore Premier League players
Expatriate footballers in Singapore
South Korean expatriate sportspeople in Singapore